The 1972 Buckeye Tennis Championships – Singles was an event of the 1972 Buckeye Tennis Championships tennis tournament and was played at the Buckeye Boys Ranch in Grove City, Columbus, Ohio in the United States between July 17 and July 23, 1972. Tom Gorman was the defending champion, but did not compete in this edition. First-seeded Jimmy Connors won the singles title, defeating Andrew Pattison 7–5, 6–3, 7–5 in the final.

Seeds

Draw

Finals

Top half

Bottom half

References

External links
 ITF tournament edition details

Buckeye Tennis Championships